Coto Laurel (Barrio Coto Laurel) is one of the 31 barrios of the municipality of Ponce, Puerto Rico. Along with Anón,  Marueño, Guaraguao, Quebrada Limon, Real, and San Patricio, and the coastal barrios of Canas and  Capitanejo, Coto Laurel is one of the municipality's nine bordering barrios. It borders the municipality of Juana Diaz. It was founded in 1831.

Location
Coto Laurel is a suburban barrio located in the southeastern section of the municipality, east of the traditional center of the city, Plaza Las Delicias. The toponymy, or origin of the name, is a proper noun related to the word coto which in Spanish denotes tracts of land ceded to citizens in exchange for services to the king and where there were laurel trees.

Boundaries
It is bounded on the north by Río Inabón and Lake Number 5, on the south by Esperanza Street, on the west by PR-10 (roughly), and on the east by Río Inabón.  In terms of barrio-to-barrio boundaries, Coto Laurel is bounded in the north by Cerrillos and Real, in the south by Vayas, in the west by Sabanetas and Cerrillos, and in the east by the municipality of Juana Díaz.

Features and demographics
In 2000, the population of Coto Laurel was 5,285. The population density in Coto Laurel was 1,468.1 persons per square mile.

In 2010, the population of Coto Laurel was 7,123 persons, and it had a density of 2,023.6 persons per square mile.

The communities of Palmarejo, Llanos del Sur, and El Monte are found in Coto Laurel. Lake Giles is also in Coto Laurel.   Coto Laurel is crossed by Puerto Rico's superhighway PR-52.  PR-14 also serves Coto Laurel.

Landmarks
Coto Laurel is home to Industrias Vassallo and Hospital San Cristobal, one of Ponce's largest hospitals. Coto Laurel's village square was built under the mayoral administration of José G. Tormos Vega in 1980.

See also

 Bolera Caribe
 List of communities in Puerto Rico

References

External links

 Coto Laurel
 

Barrio Coto Laurel
1831 establishments in Puerto Rico